Chalabre (Languedocien: Eissalabra) is a commune in the Aude department in southern France.

The capital of the Quercorb region, it is a relatively unspoilt bastide with shady streets and quiet alleyways.

The local industry died out around 70 years ago, although the buildings of many still remain.

The road to Lac de Montbel runs through Chalabre and this brings a steady stream of visitors.

The local land is rich and verdant with fruit growing a speciality. The rivers rarely run dry and the climate is more amenable than the dry weather as you approach the coast.

Population

Personalities
Jean Danjou, one of the most famous commanders of the French Foreign Legion, was born in Chalabre in 1828. He commanded the legionnaires at the celebrated Battle of Camarón.

A small plaque celebrates the birth of Joseph Raynaud in 1911. He went on to join the local Maquis in the Gers and was executed by the Germans on 7 July 1944.

See also
Communes of the Aude department

References

External links

Official site
 Randy's blog, an expat in Chalabre
Chalabre, photos of life in the region

Communes of Aude
Aude communes articles needing translation from French Wikipedia